Cournonterral is a commune in the Hérault department in southern France.

Population

Residents are known as Cournonterralais.

Festival
The town is known for an annual festival known as Pailhasses. The festival has taken place in Cournonterral every Ash Wednesday since 1346. In that year, residents held off rivals from their neighbouring village of Aumelas, thus putting an end to a long dispute over gathering firewood. Since that time, Cournonterral residents have relived the event every year. The Paillasses (people in straw-stuffed tops) chase the "white men" through the streets of the town with old rags and tissue soaked in wine sediment.

A fictionalized version of the Pailhasses is presented in Agnès Varda's film "Vagabond".

Notable people from Cournonterral
 Robert Lassalvy, editorial cartoonist
Cédric Cambon, professional footballer

See also
Communes of the Hérault department

References

Communes of Hérault